Joakim Balmy (Arabic: حكيم جو بالمي; born 17 September 1997 in France) is a French footballer.

Career

Balmy started his career with OGC Nice in the French Ligue 1, where he was on the bench on 4 occasions but never made an appearance. After that, he made one appearance for Dutch second division side SC Telstar and Bulgarian club PFC Cherno More Varna before joining Étoile Fréjus Saint-Raphaël in the French fourth division.

Personal life
Born in France, Balmy is of Algerian descent.

References

External links
 
 Foot National Profile

Living people
1997 births
People from Mantes-la-Jolie
French footballers
French sportspeople of Algerian descent
Association football defenders
Championnat National 2 players
Eerste Divisie players
First Professional Football League (Bulgaria) players
SC Telstar players
PFC Cherno More Varna players
ÉFC Fréjus Saint-Raphaël players
French expatriate footballers
French expatriate sportspeople in the Netherlands
French expatriate sportspeople in Bulgaria
Expatriate footballers in the Netherlands
Expatriate footballers in Bulgaria